The 1930 Kansas Jayhawks football team represented the University of Kansas in the Big Six Conference during the 1930 college football season. In their third season under head coach Bill Hargiss, the Jayhawks compiled a 6–2 record (4–1 against conference opponents), won the Big Six championship, and outscored opponents by a combined total of 144 to 50. They played their home games at Memorial Stadium in Lawrence, Kansas. Charles Smoot was the team captain. The Jayhawks were Big 6 champions. It is to date the last conference championship Kansas has won without sharing the title.

Schedule

References

Kansas
Kansas Jayhawks football seasons
Big Eight Conference football champion seasons
Kansas Jayhawks football